Annie Parkhouse (née Halfacree) has been one of the leading letterers in British comics for over 30 years.

Biography
Beginning her career working on Lion for IPC magazines, she has since provided dialogue for many DC Comics titles and 2000AD, working on scripts by writers and artists such as Alan Moore and Garry Leach (on Marvelman).  Annie has been the recipient of an Eagle Award for her lettering.

Following the death of Tom Frame, Parkhouse became the lead letterer on the Judge Dredd strip and continues to work on other 2000AD stories, Hellblazer, among others.

She is married to British writer/artist Steve Parkhouse.

Awards
Annie has been the recipient of an Eagle Award for her lettering.

References

Sources

Annie Parkhouse at 2000 AD online
Annie Parkhouse at Barney

External links
2005 interview with Parkhouse and Elle De Ville, 2000adreview.co.uk

Living people
Comic book letterers
British comics artists
British female comics artists
Year of birth missing (living people)
Women calligraphers
Female comics writers